John Dowie may refer to:

John Alexander Dowie (1847–1907), Scottish clergyman who founded Zion, Illinois
John Dowie (artist) (1915–2008), Australian sculptor and painter
John Dowie (footballer) (1955–2016), Scottish footballer
John Dowie (humourist) (born 1950), English comedian, musician and writer 
John Dowie (d.1817) owner of the infamous John Dowie's Tavern in Edinburgh